Vilotijević is a Montenegrin surname derived from the male given name Vilotije. It is found in Serbia and Montenegro. It that may refer to:

Mila Vilotijević, Serbian soprano
Maja-Iskra Vilotijevic
Marija Vilotijević, Serbian author
Mladen Vilotijević (born 1935), Serbian academic and author.
Dragan Vilotijević
Jelena Vilotijević
Nada Vilotijević (born 1953), Serbian professor and author.
Slavica Vilotijević
Slaviša Vilotijević
Radojica Vilotijević
Žarko Vilotijević, Montenegrin footballer

Vilotijević family in Drobnjaci
In the Drobnjaci region, there is a Vilotijević family which lives in Duže. They were earlier surnamed Grgurović, and even earlier as Dančulović, derived from Dančul, the son of voivode Ðurjan. Today's Vilotijevići descend from Vilotije Grgurović, who lived during the 18th century. Vilotije had a brother, Pavić, from whom the Pavićevići sprung. Today's Vilotijevići sprung from Vilotije's sons Redžo, Sava, Kiko, Radojica and Pejo. Radojica was a notable hero. In the beginning of the 20th century Mrdak Vilotijević was known as a good host and hero, and he died in the Battle of Mojkovac (1916). Mrdak's son, Dr. Radoš, a Yugoslav Partisan since 1941, worked as an officer in the medical corps, officer and manager of the division hospitals. These Vilotijevići are spread throughout Serbia and Montenegro (1997). They have the krsna slava (patron saint) of St. Sava (Савиндан).

See also
Secondary school "Braća Vilotijević", in Kraljevo, Serbia
Vilotić

References

Serbian surnames